James Campbell Hagerty (May 9, 1909April 11, 1981) served as the eighth White House Press Secretary from 1953 to 1961 during the Presidency of Dwight D. Eisenhower. He was known for providing much more detail on the lifestyle of the president than previous press secretaries; for example, he covered in great detail Eisenhower's medical condition.  Most of the time, he handled routine affairs such as daily reports on presidential activities, defending presidential policies, and assisting  diplomatic visitors.  He handled embarrassing episodes, such as those related to the Soviet downing of an American spy plane, the U-2 in 1960. He handled press relations on Eisenhower's international trips, sometimes taking the blame from a hostile foreign press.  Eisenhower often relied upon him for advice about public opinion, and how to phrase complex issues. Hagerty had a reputation for supporting civil rights initiatives.

Early life

After his Irish Catholic family moved to New York when he was 3 years old, James Hagerty attended Evander Childs High School in the Bronx, before enrolling in and graduating from Blair Academy, which he attended for his last two years in high school. He graduated from Columbia College in 1934, and work as a reporter for The New York Times.

Political career

He became the press secretary to Governor of New York Thomas E. Dewey in 1943, and handled Dewey's presidential campaigns in 1944 and in 1948. He was in charge of candidate Eisenhower's press office in the 1952 campaign, leading to his appointment as Press Secretary in January 1953. He introduced television cameras to press conferences in 1955. He occasionally handled political assignments from Eisenhower, such as liaison with the Senate.

"Hagerty Incident"

In 1960, Hagerty was at the center of a major diplomatic incident between the United States and Japan. On June 10, Hagerty arrived at Tokyo's Haneda Airport to make advance preparations for a planned visit to Japan by Eisenhower that was scheduled for later that month. Hagerty was picked up in a black car by US Ambassador to Japan Douglas MacArthur II (the nephew of the famous general), but as the car left the airport it was surrounded by 6,000 Japanese protesters protesting the revision of the U.S.-Japan Security Treaty as part of the broader 1960 Anpo protests. The protesters surrounded the car, rocking it back and forth for more than an hour while cracking its windows, smashing its tail lights, standing on its roof, and chanting anti-American slogans and singing protest songs. Ultimately, MacArthur and Hagerty had to be rescued by a US Marines military helicopter, creating indelible imagery of the so-called  that was transmitted by newswires around the world. The Hagerty Incident shocked much of the Japanese public, insofar as it was seen as a grave discourtesy to a foreign guest, and contributed to the cancellation of Eisenhower's visit, for fear that his safety could not be guaranteed, as well as the forced resignation of Japanese prime minister Nobusuke Kishi shortly thereafter.

Television work

Hagerty appeared as a mystery challenger on the March 10, 1957, and panelist on the June 23, 1957 episodes of What's My Line?

After Eisenhower left office in January 1961, Hagerty became a vice president of the ABC television network, serving from 1961–1975.

Quotes
"If you lose your temper at a newspaper columnist, he'll get rich or famous or both."

References

Further reading

 Rutland, Robert A. (1957). "President Eisenhower and His Press Secretary." Journalism Quarterly 34:4, pp. 452–534. 
 Parry‐Giles, Shawn J. (1996). "'Camouflaged' propaganda: The Truman and Eisenhower administrations’ covert manipulation of news." Western Journal of Communication 60:2, pp. 146–167.

Primary sources
 Hagerty, James Campbell. The diary of James C. Hagerty: Eisenhower in mid-course, 1954-1955 (Indiana University Press, 1983), A primary source.
 Salinger, Pierre, and James Campbell Hagerty. The Press and Presidential Leadership (University of Minnesota, School of Journalism., 1961); Salinger was the Press Secretary to President Kennedy

External links
Papers of James C. Hagerty, Dwight D. Eisenhower Presidential Library
Finding aid for James C. Hagerty Oral History, Dwight D. Eisenhower Presidential Library

1909 births
1981 deaths
20th-century American writers
American male journalists
20th-century American journalists
Blair Academy alumni
Eisenhower administration personnel
The New York Times writers
White House Press Secretaries
Columbia College (New York) alumni
New York (state) Republicans